Glaurocara is a genus of parasitic flies in the family Tachinidae. There are about 15 described species in Glaurocara.

Species
These 15 species belong to the genus Glaurocara:

 Glaurocara flava Thomson, 1869
 Glaurocara flavicornis (Malloch, 1927)
 Glaurocara ghilarovi Richter, 1988
 Glaurocara glauca Mesnil, 1978
 Glaurocara grandipennis Mesnil, 1978
 Glaurocara leleupi (Verbeke, 1960)
 Glaurocara livida Mesnil, 1978
 Glaurocara lucidula Richter, 1988
 Glaurocara nigrescens Mesnil, 1978
 Glaurocara nigrocornis (Malloch, 1927)
 Glaurocara nitidiventris (Malloch, 1927)
 Glaurocara obesa (Villeneuve, 1937)
 Glaurocara russea Mesnil, 1978
 Glaurocara townsendi Emden, 1960
 Glaurocara violacea Mesnil, 1978

References

Further reading

 
 
 
 

Tachinidae
Articles created by Qbugbot